Anita Ganeri (born 1961) is an Indian author of the award-winning series Horrible Geography and many other non-fiction books for children.

Early life and education
Ganeri was born in Calcutta, India and her family emigrated to England when she was a baby. She boarded at Stamford High School, and graduated from Cambridge University with a degree in French/German and Indian Studies.

Career
Ganeri worked in publishing for several years - first as a foreign rights manager for Walker, and later as an editor at Usborne - before becoming a freelance writer. Her first published book was a Ladybird book on 'how things work'. In total, she has written over 600 non-fiction books, at a rate of 15-20 per year. Her work on the Horrible Geography series led to her becoming a Fellow of the Royal Geographical Society.

Personal life
Ganeri lives in Ilkley, West Yorkshire, with her husband, the children's author Chris Oxlade.

Awards

Selected works

Horrible Geography series
 Odious Oceans (1999)
 Stormy Weather (1999)
 Violent Volcanoes (1999)
 Desperate Deserts (2000)
 Earth-Shattering Earthquakes (2000)
 Raging Rivers (2000)
 Bloomin' Rainforests (2001)
 Freaky Peaks (2001)
 Perishing Poles (2002)
 Intrepid Explorers (2003)
 Wild Islands (2004)
 Monster Lakes (2005)
 Cracking Coasts (2006)
 Horrible Geography of the World (2007) - name changed in later editions to Wicked World Tour
 Horrible Geography Handbook: Wicked Weather (2008)
 Horrible Geography Handbook: Wild Animals (2008)
 Horrible Geography Handbook: Planet in Peril (2009)
 Horrible Geography Handbook: Vile Volcanoes (2010)
 Horrible Geography Handbook: Perilous Poles (2010)

See also

 List of children's non-fiction writers
Horrible Histories

References

External links

 

Living people
British children's writers
British non-fiction writers
People educated at Stamford High School, Lincolnshire
Date of birth missing (living people)
Alumni of the University of Cambridge
1961 births
Fellows of the Royal Geographical Society